George Malcolm White FAIA (November 1, 1920 – June 17, 2011) was an American architect who served as the Architect of the Capitol from January 27, 1971, to November 21, 1995.

Life
He was born in Cleveland, Ohio and attended the Massachusetts Institute of Technology at the age of sixteen. He graduated with a B.S. and an M.S. in electrical engineering in 1941. He later received an M.B.A. from Harvard and a J.D. from Case Western Reserve University. He oversaw the construction of the Library of Congress James Madison Memorial Building and the Hart Senate Office Building, as well as the restoration of the old Supreme Court and Senate chambers.

References

External links
 Architect of the Capitol biography
 

1920 births
2011 deaths
Place of death missing
Architects of the United States Capitol
20th-century American architects
MIT School of Engineering alumni
Harvard Business School alumni
Case Western Reserve University School of Law alumni
People from Cleveland